Guglielmo Gonzaga (24 April 1538 – 14 August 1587) was Duke of Mantua from 1550 to 1587, and of Montferrat from 1574 to 1587. He was the second son of Federico II Gonzaga, Duke of Mantua and Margaret Palaeologina of Montferrat. In 1574, Montferrat was elevated to a Duchy and Guglielmo became its first duke. He was succeeded as Duke of both duchies by his son Vincenzo.

Patron of music 
Guglielmo was particularly interested in sacred vocal music, and is known particularly to music historians for his extensive correspondence with the composer Giovanni Pierluigi da Palestrina. He built a large new church in Mantua, dedicated to Santa Barbara. He engaged in an unprecedented negotiation with the Papacy to create his own rite for Mantua, and devoted considerable resources to developing a musical repertoire for the church, commissioning works by Giaches de Wert and Palestrina. Part of his correspondence with Palestrina discusses the work commissioned in detail, stipulating Guglielmo's requirements, and therefore giving a sense of his musical preferences. Guglielmo's musical tastes were conservative for the day. He enjoyed imitative contrapuntal music but was concerned to maintain clarity of text, thereby showing the influence of Tridentine reforms. Upon his death, his son Vincent invited followers of the more modern trends to his court.

Three months before his death, Gonzaga wounded the organist of the ducal basilica, Ruggier Trofeo, in an encounter over a woman; the latter survived his injuries.

Marriage and children
On 26 April 1561 William married Eleonora of Austria, sixth daughter of Ferdinand I, Holy Roman Emperor and Anna of Bohemia and Hungary. They had:

Vincenzo I (21 September 1562 – 9 February 1612). Married Eleonora de' Medici 
Margherita Gonzaga (27 May 1564 – 6 January 1618). Married Alfonso II d'Este
Anna Caterina Gonzaga (17 January 1566 – 3 August 1621). Married her maternal uncle Ferdinand II, Archduke of Austria

Ancestry

References

Sources

Further reading 
Iain Fenlon, Music and Patronage in Sixteenth-Century Mantua, Cambridge University Press, 1980. .

|-

1538 births
1587 deaths
Guglielno I
Guglielmo 1
Guglielmo 1
Guglielmo 1
16th-century Italian nobility
Burials at the Palatine Basilica of Santa Barbara (Mantua)